The 2022 Perak state election, formally the 15th Perak state election, took place on  19 November 2022. This election was to elect 59 members of the 15th Perak State Legislative Assembly. The previous assembly was dissolved on 17 October 2022.

The results of the election resulted in a hung assembly, Perikatan Nasional (PN) won 26 seats, Pakatan Harapan (PH) won 24 while the incumbent Barisan Nasional (BN) which led the administration before election, only won 9. However, two days after the election, caretaker Menteri Besar Saarani Mohammad was reappointed to the position and the state government was formed on 21 November 2022 after the agreement of BN and PH to form the coalition government, it exceeded the simple majority support of 30 members of the assembly (MLAs) required to form the state government. They achieved the support of 33 MLAs, 24 from PH and 9 from BN. Saarani of BN was reappointed to the position of the head of government although BN is a minor coalition in the government. This saw the historic first political cooperation between BN and PH, which were bitter political rivals before this. A day after this, the other members of the state government, namely the members of the Perak State Executive Council, (EXCO) were also appointed.  The EXCO line-up consists of 3 MLAs of BN and 7 MLAs of PH. The reason why the higher number of PH EXCO members was appointed is PH is the major while BN is the minor coalitions in the government according to the number of their MLAs respectively.

Constituencies

Demographics

Outgoing members of the assembly 
The following members of the 14th State Legislative Assembly did not participate in this election.

Electoral candidates

Results

By parliamentary constituency
Combination of Pakatan Harapan (won 11 of 24) and Barisan Nasional (won 3 of 24); results both coalitions to won 14 of 24 parliamentary constituency.

Seats that changed allegiance

See also 
 2022 Malaysian general election
 Politics of Malaysia
 List of political parties in Malaysia

Notes

References 

2022 elections in Malaysia
2022 in Malaysia
2022 in Malaysian politics
November 2022 events in Malaysia
Perak state elections